Alex Perry (born 1963) is an Australian fashion designer and television presenter.

Alex Perry may also refer to:

 Alex Perry (Australian footballer) (born 1940), Australian rules footballer
 Alex Perry (English footballer) (born 1998), English football midfielder
 Alex Perry (table tennis) (born 1980), English table tennis player
 Alex Ross Perry (born 1984), American film director, screenwriter and actor